Machatas was a sculptor, whose name is known by two inscriptions  in Acarnania (Anaktorio) from which it appears that he made a statue of Hercules, which was dedicated by one Laphanes, son of Lasthenes. He is also mentioned in the second inscription as the maker of a statue dedicated to Asclepius.

Notes

References
 

Ancient Greek sculptors
Ancient Acarnanians